The 2010 Copa Topper was a professional tennis tournament played on outdoor red clay courts. It was the first edition of the tournament which was part of the 2010 ATP Challenger Tour. It took place in Buenos Aires, Argentina between 22 and 28 November 2010.

ATP entrants

Seeds

 Rankings are as of November 15, 2010.

Other entrants
The following players received wildcards into the singles main draw:
  Guillermo Bujniewicz
  Diego Sebastián Schwartzman
  Marco Trungelliti
  Agustín Velotti

The following players received entry from the qualifying draw:
  Rafael Camilo
  Maximiliano Estévez
  Alejandro Fabbri
  Jonathan Gonzalia
  Rodrigo Guidolin (LL)

Champions

Singles

 Diego Junqueira def.  Juan Pablo Brzezicki, 6–2, 6–1

Doubles

 Carlos Berlocq /  Brian Dabul def.  Andrés Molteni /  Guido Pella, 7–6(4), 6–3

External links
Official website
ITF search 
2010 Draws

Copa Topper
Clay court tennis tournaments
Tennis tournaments in Argentina
Challenger de Buenos Aires